Norberto Almeida Monteiro Alves (born 19 March 1968) is a Portuguese basketball head coach for S.L. Benfica of the Liga Portuguesa de Basquetebol.

Professional career
In 2019, Alves guided U.D. Oliveirense to its second national title in league history, against S.L. Benfica.

References

External links
Norberto Alves basketball profile

1968 births
Living people
Portuguese basketball coaches
S.L. Benfica basketball coaches
Sportspeople from Coimbra